The Half-Breed is a 1952 American Western film directed by Stuart Gilmore and written by Harold Shumate, Richard Wormser and Charles Hoffman. The film stars Robert Young, Janis Carter, Jack Buetel, Barton MacLane, Reed Hadley and Porter Hall. The film was released on May 4, 1952, by RKO Pictures.

Plot
The Apache near the fictional town of San Remo, Arizona, are subject to exploitation by local whites and a corrupt US Indian agent. Charlie Wolf (known as the half-breed for his partial European ancestry) tries to lead his people during difficult times. Dan Craig (Robert Young) is a gambler who comes to town and gets involved in negotiations between Wolf and the townspeople, who fear an Apache attack. At the same time, there are rumors of gold in the ground under the Apache reservation, increasing the threat to them by European-American encroachment.

Cast 
 Robert Young as Dan Craig
 Janis Carter as Helen Dowling
 Jack Buetel as Charlie Wolf
 Barton MacLane as Marshal Cassidy
 Reed Hadley as Frank Crawford
 Porter Hall as Kraemer 
 Connie Gilchrist as Ma Higgins
 Sammy White as Willy Wayne
 Damian O'Flynn as Capt. Jackson 
 Frank Wilcox as Sands
 Judy Walsh as Nah-Lin
 Tom Monroe as Russell

References

External links 
 
 
 
 

1952 films
American black-and-white films
1950s English-language films
RKO Pictures films
American Western (genre) films
1952 Western (genre) films
Films scored by Paul Sawtell
1950s American films